Benjamin Meyers (born November 5, 1998) is an American professional ice hockey forward for the Colorado Eagles in the American Hockey League (AHL) as a prospect to the Colorado Avalanche of the National Hockey League (NHL). He played college ice hockey at the University of Minnesota.

Playing career
He was selected to represent the United States in the men's tournament at the 2022 Winter Olympics, alongside teammates Brock Faber and Matthew Knies. On April 13, 2022, Meyers signed a two-year contract with the Colorado Avalanche of the National Hockey League (NHL).

International play
On May 5, 2022, Meyers was named to the United States men's national ice hockey team to compete at the 2022 IIHF World Championship. He recorded four goals and four assists in ten games.

Career statistics

Regular season and playoffs

International

Awards and honors

References

External links
 

1998 births
Living people
AHCA Division I men's ice hockey All-Americans
American men's ice hockey forwards
Colorado Avalanche players
Colorado Eagles players
Fargo Force players
Ice hockey people from Minnesota
Ice hockey players at the 2022 Winter Olympics
Minnesota Golden Gophers men's ice hockey players
Olympic ice hockey players of the United States
Undrafted National Hockey League players